Robert Emory Lamb  (born December 24, 1962) is an American college football coach and former player. He was most recently the head football coach at Mercer University, a position he assumed in 2011 when Mercer reinstated their football program after a 72-year hiatus. The Mercer Bears football program resumed play in 2013. Lamb served as the head football coach at Furman University from 2002 until his resignation in 2010.

Playing career
Lamb attended Commerce High School in Commerce, Georgia, from 1978 to 1981, where he played quarterback. Along with current Furman University head football coach Clay Hendrix He led the team to the 1981 AA State Championship and was named The Atlanta Journal-Constitution's AA Back of the Year.

From 1982 to 1985, Lamb played quarterback for the Furman Paladins, a Division I-AA program, where he was a two-year starter. During Lamb's playing career, the Paladins defeated three Division I-A teams: South Carolina (1982), Georgia Tech (1983), and NC State (1984 and 1985). In 1985, Lamb helped lead the Paladins to the Southern Conference championship, and he was named Southern Conference Player of the Year. The Paladins suffered a two-point loss to Georgia Southern in the 1985 NCAA Division I-AA Football Championship Game, with Lamb throwing for one touchdown and rushing for another.

Coaching career
Lamb began coaching as an assistant for the Paladins in 1986 and was the defensive ends coach on the 1988 team that won the NCAA Division I-AA Football Championship. He became the quarterbacks coach in 1989, a position filled until taking over head coaching duties in 2002. In November 2010, he announced his resignation from Furman after the team had missed the playoffs four straight years.

On January 20, 2011, Lamb was announced be the first modern head football coach for Mercer University, which began playing football in 2013 after the sport's 70-year absence from campus.

On November 24, 2019, Lamb was terminated as Mercer's football coach after the team went 4–8 that season, including 3–5 in the Southern Conference. He finished with an overall record of 41–39 after seven seasons.

Lamb is set to become the first ever football coach of Anderson University (Anderson, SC) in 2024, once the program begins.

Personal
Lamb has a brother, Hal, who is the head football coach and athletic director at Calhoun High School in Calhoun, Georgia. Lamb is active in bringing about public awareness of shoulder Cleidocranial dysplasia. Lamb's son Taylor was quarterback for the Appalachian State Mountaineers from 2014 to 2017 and is QB Coach at Gardner-Webb University.

Head coaching record

References

External links
 Anderson (SC) profile
 Mercer profile

1962 births
Living people
American football quarterbacks
Furman Paladins football players
Furman Paladins football coaches
Mercer Bears football coaches
People from Commerce, Georgia
Coaches of American football from Georgia (U.S. state)
Players of American football from Augusta, Georgia